Lewisham is a locality and suburb of [Sorell] in the local government area of Sorell, in the Sorell and surrounds region of Tasmania. The 2016 census determined a population of 691 for the state suburb of Lewisham.

History
The locality is named for the family of Dr Arndell Lewis, an Australian politician. It was proclaimed as a town in 1957, and changed to a suburb/locality in 1988. The shore of Pitt Water forms the western and south-western boundaries.

Road infrastructure
The C340 route (Lewisham Scenic Drive) runs south from the Arthur Highway through the locality, providing access to other localities.

References

East Coast Tasmania
Towns in Tasmania
Localities of Sorell Council